Below are lists of films produced in Hong Kong in the 1960s.

List of Hong Kong films of 1960
List of Hong Kong films of 1961
List of Hong Kong films of 1962
List of Hong Kong films of 1963
List of Hong Kong films of 1964
List of Hong Kong films of 1965
List of Hong Kong films of 1966
List of Hong Kong films of 1967
List of Hong Kong films of 1968
List of Hong Kong films of 1969

See also
List of films set in Hong Kong

External links
 IMDB list of Hong Kong films

Films
Hong Kong